John Knowles (born 1942) is an American acoustic guitarist.

Career
Knowles first learned accordion, then ukulele, transposing the accordion keyboard to the ukulele fretboard. He studied guitar in high school, then attended Texas Christian University, where he received a degree in physics while playing guitar in his free time.

Knowles is a C.G.P. (Certified Guitar Player), a title Chet Atkins gave to fingerstyle guitarists he admired. The others are Tommy Emmanuel, Marcel Dadi, Jerry Reed, and Steve Wariner. Four of the CGP had their titles formalized by the CAAS (Chet Atkins Appreciation Society): Knowles, Emmanuel, Wariner, and Reed. After Atkins's death, his daughter gave a posthumous CGP to Paul Yandell, Atkins's guitar partner.

Honors
 CGP member, Chet Atkins, 1996
 Induction, National Thumb Picker's Hall of Fame, 2004
 Grammy Award, two Emmy Award nominations

Discography

As leader
 Sittin' Back Pickin (Sound Hole, 1979)
 Heart Songs with Tommy Emmanuel (CGP, 2019)

As sideman
 Chet Atkins, The First Nashville Guitar Quartet (RCA Victor, 1979)
 Tommy Emmanuel, Little by Little (Favored Nations, 2010)
 James Galway, The Wayward Wind (RCA, 1982)

References

Living people
1942 births
Texas Christian University alumni
American country guitarists
American male guitarists
Fingerstyle guitarists
Grammy Award winners
Acoustic guitarists
20th-century American guitarists
20th-century American male musicians